An obituary is a death notice.

Obituary may also refer to:

 A calendar with entries of deceased donors Anniversary Book
 Obituary (band), an American death metal band
 Obituary (album), 2017
 Necrology (EP), a 1991 EP by General Surgery
 "Obituary" (short story), a story by Isaac Asimov
 Obituary, a fictional character in the O-Force, in the Marvel Comics universe
 The Obituaries, an American rock band